Lan Tianli (born October 1962) is a Chinese politician currently serving as chairman and deputy party chief of Guangxi and chairman of the Guangxi Zhuang Autonomous Region Committee of the Chinese People's Political Consultative Conference. He is of Zhuang ethnicity. He is an alternate member of the 19th Central Committee of the Chinese Communist Party.

Biography
Lan was born in Yizhou District, Hechi, Guangxi, in October 1962. He taught at local schools since 1980. After graduating from Guangxi University for Nationalities in 1987, he was dispatched to the Science and Technology Commission of Guangxi Zhuang Autonomous Region, where he was promoted to its director in 2003. After receiving his master's degree in political economics from Guangxi University in 1996, he earned his doctor's degree in management science and engineering from Beihang University.

He served as deputy party chief and mayor of Hechi in 2007, and one year later promoted to the party chief position. In 2011 he became vice-chairman of the Guangxi Zhuang Autonomous Region Committee of the Chinese People's Political Consultative Conference, rising to chairman in 2018. In October 2020, the Central Committee of the Chinese Communist Party appointed him deputy party chief of Guangxi. On October 19, he was elected chairman at the 19th session of the Standing Committee of the 13th People's Congress of Guangxi Zhuang Autonomous Region.

References

1962 births
Living people
People from Hechi
Zhuang people
Guangxi University alumni
Guangxi University for Nationalities alumni
Beihang University alumni
People's Republic of China politicians from Guangxi
Chinese Communist Party politicians from Guangxi
Members of the 20th Central Committee of the Chinese Communist Party